Justin Rosniak (born 11 May 1977) is an Australian television and film actor, best known for his appearances in the television series Packed to the Rafters, Police Rescue,  Squinters and Mr Inbetween.

Career
Rosniak appeared as Tony in 1997's Spellbinder: Land of the Dragon Lord, and in the same year voiced the title role in the animated television series The Adventures of Sam. 

He has appeared in Home and Away three times, in 1988 as McPhee, the grandson of regular character's Neville and Floss McPhee, in 1995 as Joseph Lynch, and in 2018 as Ross Nixon. 

In 2010, Rosniak was cast in a supporting role in Animal Kingdom and in 2011 was in Underbelly: Razor, playing the part of notorious Australian career criminal, Squizzy Taylor.

In 2018, Rosniak was one of the regular cast members in the comedy series Squinters.

Rosniak appears in the 2019 Australian crime-thriller film Locusts.

Filmography

References

External links 
 

Australian male television actors
Living people
1977 births
Australian male child actors